The 1978 Calgary Stampeders finished in 2nd place in the Western Conference with a 9–4–3 record. They appeared in the Western Final where they lost to the Edmonton Eskimos.

Roster

Regular season

Season Standings

Season schedule

Playoffs

West Semi-Final

West Final

Awards and records
CFL's Coach of the Year – Jack Gotta

1978 CFL All-Stars
RB – James Sykes, CFL All-Star
OG – Harold Holton, CFL All-Star
DT – John Helton, CFL All-Star
DE – Reggie Lewis, CFL All-Star

References

Calgary Stampeders seasons
1978 Canadian Football League season by team